Diego Morejón is the former Permanent Representative of Ecuador to the United Nations.

References

Living people
Year of birth missing (living people)
Place of birth missing (living people)
Permanent Representatives of Ecuador to the United Nations